Brazilian midfielder Kaká won the 2007 FIFA World Player of the Year award, while another Brazilian, Marta, took home the women's award. The winners were announced at the FIFA World Player Gala held at the Zurich Opera House on December 17, 2007.

Results

Men

Women

References

Men final standings
Women final standings

FIFA World Player of the Year
FIFA World Player of the Year
Women's association football trophies and awards
2007 in women's association football